Wayne Jason Roberts (born 14 August 1977 in Cape Town, Western Cape) is a retired South African football (soccer) goalkeeper who last played for Premier Soccer League club Engen Santos. He also represented South Africa.Roberts hails from Strandfontein on the Cape Flats where he was schooled at Strandfontein High.

In May 2017 he was arrested for possession of illegal drugs

Previous clubs: Wits University, Ajax Cape Town, Orlando Pirates, Cape Town Spurs
Bafana Bafana caps won: 1

References

External links

1977 births
Living people
Cape Town Spurs F.C. players
Cape Coloureds
Orlando Pirates F.C. players
Sportspeople from Cape Town
South African soccer players
South Africa international soccer players
Bidvest Wits F.C. players
Santos F.C. (South Africa) players
2004 African Cup of Nations players
Association football goalkeepers